Norman England (disambiguation) may refer to:

 Norman England, England after the Norman invasion
 Norman England, a pen name of writer Godfrey Webb